This is a list of the Spanish Singles number-ones of 1964.

Chart history

See also
1964 in music
List of number-one hits (Spain)

References

1964
Spain Singles
Number-one singles